The 2011 WPA World Eight-ball Championship was an eight-ball world championship, organized by the World Pool-Billiard Association (WPA), and held 19–26 February 2011 at the Fujairah Exhibition Centre of the Al Diar Siji Hotel in Fujairah, United Arab Emirates. A total of 116 players from all of the WPA's six regions participated.

The event was won by Dennis Orcollo of the Philippines, who won the event with a 9–2 win in the final over Niels Feijen of the Netherlands. David Alcaide of Spain, and Darren Appleton of England were third and fourth respectively. The total prize money for the event was US$205,000.  The event is also referred to as the 2011 Etisalat World 8 Ball Pool Championship, among other variations, for sponsorship purposes.

Tournament format
Double-elimination tournament on stage one until 56 players are left.
Race to seven racks
Single-elimination tournament on stage two:
The undefeated players are seeded on stage 2 and the best eight will receive first round byes.
Race to nine racks, except for the final which is race to eleven.

Schedule and prize money

Ranked players

 Karl Boyes
 Francisco Bustamante
 Antonio Lining
 Kuo Po-Cheng
 Jeffrey De Luna
 Niels Feijen
 Vicenancio Tanio
 Marlon Manalo
 Oliver Medinilla
 Lee Van Corteza
 Shane Van Boening
 Ruslan Chinakhov
 Scott Higgins
 Raymund Faron

Stage 1

Group A

Group B

Group C

Group D

Group E

Group F

Group G

Group H

Group I

Group J

Group K

Group L

Group M

Group N

Stage 2

Playoff
Vincent Facquet  defeated Phuc Lung Nguyen  3–2 for eighth seed and the last bye to the Round of 32.

Upper half

Lower half

Semifinals and Final

References

External links
event at AZbilliards.com
Official World 8-ball Championship website

WPA World Eight-ball Championship
WPA World Eight-ball Championship
WPA World Eight-ball Championship
International sports competitions hosted by the United Arab Emirates